Birdville High School (BHS) is a public high school located in the city of North Richland Hills, Texas and is the second newest school in the Birdville Independent School District (second to Walker Creek Elementary). Established in 1999, it was the third high school built into the Birdville Independent School District. Birdville High School is home to the Birdville Hawks and hosts grades 9-12. For the 2009-2010 school year, according to the TEA (Texas Education Agency), Birdville High School's population consisted of 6.3% Black/African American, 20.6% Hispanic/Latino(a), 68.3% White/Caucasian, 0.6% Native American, and 4.2% Asian/Pacific Islander.

Academics
Birdville High School offers Advanced Placement courses including Math, Science, Social Studies, English, Foreign Language, Fine Arts, and Computer Science. The majority of Birdville High School's TAKS scores are higher than both the District and State's average percentage of meeting or exceeding standards in all grades tested.

Athletics

Football
The Birdville Hawks Football Team plays in Texas Division 5A Football. They host their games at the Birdville ISD Fine Arts/Athletics Complex  in North Richland Hills, Texas which they share with Richland High School and Haltom High School. The BISD Complex is also used to host soccer games and fine arts events.

Basketball
The Birdville Hawks Boys Basketball Team plays in Texas Division 5A Boys Basketball.

The Birdville Lady Hawks Basketball Team plays in Texas Division 5A Girls Basketball.

Baseball
The Birdville Hawks Baseball Team plays in Texas Division 5A Baseball. They host their games at the Hawk Yard in North Richland Hills, Texas.

Volleyball
The Birdville Lady Hawks Volleyball Team plays in Texas Division 5A Girls Volleyball.

Track and field

Other sports
Birdville Lady Hawks Softball 
Birdville Hawks Girls Soccer
Birdville's Hawk Tennis Team
Birdville Hawks Boys Soccer
Birdville Hawks Swim Team
Birdville Hawks Golf Team
Birdville Men's Gymnastics
Birdville Women's Gymnastics
Birdville Wrestling Team

Notable alumni
Anthony Bardon, international soccer player who plays for the Gibraltar national football team
Jonathan Stickland, Republican member of the Texas House of Representatives from District 92 in Tarrant County
Logan Henderson, actor and member of Big Time Rush

External links
BISD Official Website

References

Birdville Independent School District high schools
North Richland Hills, Texas
Educational institutions established in 1999
1999 establishments in Texas